Coredo (Nones: Còret) was a comune (municipality) in Trentino in the northern Italian region Trentino-Alto Adige/Südtirol, located about  north of Trento. It was merged with Smarano, Taio, Tres and Vervò on January 1, 2015, to form a new municipality, Predaia.

Gallery

References
 

Cities and towns in Trentino-Alto Adige/Südtirol
Nonsberg Group
Former municipalities of Trentino